The 1928 Fresno State Bulldogs football team represented Fresno State Normal School—now known as California State University, Fresno—during the 1928 college football season.

Fresno State competed in the Far Western Conference (FWC). The 1928 team was led by head coach Arthur W. Jones in his eighth and last year at the helm. They played home games at [[[Ratcliffe Stadium|Fresno State College Stadium]] on the campus of Fresno City College in Fresno, California. They finished with a record of two wins, five losses and one tie (2–5–1, 0–3–1 FWC). The Bulldogs were outscored by their opponents 56–288 for the season and were shut out in five of the eight games.

Schedule

Notes

References

Fresno State
Fresno State Bulldogs football seasons
Fresno State Bulldogs football